Sir Patrick Fairweather  (born 17 June 1936) is a British retired diplomat. He served as Ambassador to Angola from 1985 to 1987 and Ambassador to Italy and concurrently Albania from 1992 to 1996. He was director of the Butrint Foundation which was concerned with the archaeology and conservation  of the  classical  site of Butrint in southern Albania from 1997 until 2004.

Background
Fairweather, the son of John George Fairweather and Dorothy Jane (née Boanas), was educated at Ottershaw School in Surrey and Trinity College, Cambridge, where he graduated with a degree in history. He married Maria (née Merica) in 1962 and the couple have two daughters. Maria died in 2010, having completed biographies of Princess Volkonsky (1999) and Madame de Staël (2005).

Career
After  National Service  ( 1955-57 ) in the Royal Marines and Parachute Regiment  and a brief spell in advertising, Fairweather entered Diplomatic Service in  1965. He served as 2nd Secretary in Rome from 1966 to 1969 and 1st Secretary ( Economic) in Paris from 1970 to  1973.

In 1975, Fairweather was posted to Vientiane ( Laos ) as 1st Secretary and Head of Chancery . In late 1976 after the Communist takeover of Laos and the subsequent downgrading of the embassy , he was appointed 1st secretary in the trade section of the UK Representation to  the European Economic Community (EEC) in Brussels. In August  1978 he moved to  Athens as Economic and Commercial Counsellor.  In January 1983 Fairweather returned to London as  Head of European Community Department (Internal) of the FCO.

In  October 1985  Fairweather took over as Ambassador to Angola ( and concurrently Sao Tome ) . His colleague  Robin Renwick later wrote that during his two-year term in Angola  he "served as the indispensable channel of communications for the Americans". In  late 1987, he became Assistant Under-Secretary of State of the FCO for Africa and was  promoted Deputy Under-Secretary for the Middle East and Africa  in September 1990.  In June 1992 he was appointed Ambassador to Italy ( and  concurrently Albania). He left Rome on retirement in June  1996. 

After leaving the Diplomatic Service, Fairweather was appointed Senior Adviser at  the investment banking arm of Schroders Bank  ( merged with Citibank in 2000 ).  He also served as the first director of the Butrint Foundation, which concerned itself with the archaeology and conservation of the archaeological site of Butrint  in southern Albania from 1997 until 2004.

References

External links
Transcript of interview with Sir Patrick Fairweather, British Diplomatic Oral History Programme, Churchill College, Cambridge

Ambassadors of the United Kingdom to Albania
1936 births
Living people
Ambassadors of the United Kingdom to Angola
Alumni of Trinity College, Cambridge
Knights Commander of the Order of St Michael and St George